Zulfikar Ali Bhutto (5 January 1928 – 4 April 1979) was a Pakistani barrister and politician who served as the fourth President from 1971 to 1973, and later as the ninth Prime Minister of Pakistan from 1973 to 1977. His government drafted the Constitution of Pakistan in 1973, which remains in effect. He was the founder of the Pakistan People's Party (PPP) and served as its chairman until his execution. His daughter, Benazir Bhutto later led the Pakistan People's Party (PPP) and was the 11th and 13th Prime Minister of Pakistan; his grandson, Bilawal Bhutto Zardari is the current chairman of the PPP, and is serving as the Foreign Minister of Pakistan.

Born in Sindh and educated at the University of California, Berkeley and the University of Oxford, Bhutto trained as a barrister at Lincoln's Inn, before entering politics as one of President Iskander Mirza's cabinet members, and was assigned several ministries during President Ayub Khan's military rule from 1958. Appointed Foreign Minister in 1963, Bhutto was a proponent of Operation Gibraltar in Kashmir, leading to war with India in 1965. After the Tashkent Agreement ended hostilities, Bhutto fell out with Ayub Khan and was sacked from government. Bhutto founded the PPP in 1967 on a socialist platform, and contested general elections held by President Yahya Khan in 1970. While the Awami League won a majority of seats overall (nationwide), the PPP won a majority of seats in West Pakistan only (where Awami League did not win any seat); the two parties were unable to agree on the power transfer and a new constitution. In particular, Awami League's Six Point Movement was seen by many in West Pakistan including President Yahya Khan and Z. A. Bhutto as a way to break up the country. The refusal of Bhutto and Yahya to accept a Bengali as the Prime Minister of Pakistan led to the uprisings and movements in East Pakistan, and counter steps taken by the Army ordered by Yahya Khan and supported by Bhutto ultimately led to the Creation of Bangladesh. In the wake of Pakistan losing the war against Bangladesh-allied India in December, 1971, Bhutto took the presidency in December 1971 and emergency rule was imposed. When Bhutto set about rebuilding Pakistan, he stated his intention was to "rebuild confidence and rebuild hope for the future".

By July 1972, Bhutto recovered 93,000 prisoners of war and 5,000 sq mi of Indian-held territory after signing the Simla Agreement. He strengthened ties with China and Saudi Arabia, recognised Bangladesh, and hosted the second Organisation of the Islamic Conference in Lahore in 1974. Domestically, Bhutto's reign saw parliament unanimously approve a new constitution in 1973, upon which he appointed Fazal Ilahi Chaudhry President and switched to the newly empowered office of Prime Minister. He also played an integral role in initiating the country's nuclear programme. However, Bhutto's nationalisation of much of Pakistan's fledgling industries, healthcare, and educational institutions was met with economic stagnation. After dissolving provincial feudal governments in Balochistan was met with unrest, Bhutto also ordered an army operation in the province in 1973, causing thousands of civilian casualties. Despite civil disorder, the PPP won parliamentary elections in 1977 by a wide margin. However, the opposition alleged widespread vote rigging, and violence escalated across the country. On 5 July that same year, Bhutto was deposed in a military coup by his appointed army chief Zia-ul-Haq, before being controversially tried and executed by the Supreme Court of Pakistan in 1979 for authorising the murder of a political opponent.

Bhutto remains a contentious figure, being hailed for his nationalism and secular internationalist agenda, yet criticized for intimidating his political opponents and for human rights violations. He is often considered one of Pakistan's greatest leaders, and his party, the PPP, remains among Pakistan's largest, with his daughter Benazir Bhutto being twice elected Prime Minister, while his son-in-law and Benazir's husband, Asif Ali Zardari, served as president.

Early life 
Zulfikar Ali Bhutto belonged to a Sindhi Bhutto family, he was born to Sir Shah Nawaz Bhutto and Khursheed Begum near Larkana. Zulfikar was their third child—their first one, Sikandar Ali, had died from pneumonia at age seven in 1914, and the second, Imdad Ali, died of cirrhosis at age 39 in 1953. His father was the dewan of the princely state of Junagadh, and enjoyed an influential relationship with the officials of the British Raj. As a young boy, Bhutto moved to Worli Seaface in Bombay to study at the Cathedral and John Connon School, later St. Xavier's College, Mumbai. He then also became an activist in the Pakistan Movement. In 1943, his marriage was arranged with Shireen Amir Begum. In 1947, Bhutto was admitted to the University of Southern California to study political science.

In 1949, as a sophomore, Bhutto transferred to the University of California, Berkeley, where he earned a B.A. (honours) degree in political science in 1950. year later on 8 September 1951 he married a woman of Iranian Kurdish origin— Nusrat Ispahani, popularly known as Begum Nusrat Bhutto. During his studies in University of California, Berkeley, Bhutto became interested in the theories of socialism, delivering a series of lectures on their feasibility in Islamic countries. During this time, Bhutto's father played a controversial role in the affairs of Junagadh. Coming to power in a palace coup, he secured the accession of his state to Pakistan, which was ultimately negated by Indian intervention in December 1947. In June 1950, Bhutto travelled to the United Kingdom to study law at Christ Church, Oxford and received a BA in jurisprudence, followed by an LLM degree in law and an M.Sc. (honours) degree in political science. Upon finishing his studies, he served as a lecturer in international law at the University of Southampton in 1952 and he was called to the bar at Lincoln's Inn in 1953. He was fellow of Barrister Ijaz Hussain Batalvi who later appeared in his case as prosecutor.

Political career 
In 1957, Bhutto became the youngest member of Pakistan's delegation to the United Nations. He addressed the UN Sixth Committee on Aggression that October and led Pakistan's delegation to the first UN Conference on the Law of the Sea in 1958. That year, Bhutto became Pakistan's youngest cabinet minister, taking up the reins of the Ministry of Commerce by President Iskander Mirza, pre-coup d'état government. In 1960, he was promoted to Minister of Water and Power, Communications and Industry. Bhutto became trusted ally and advisor of Ayub Khan, rising in influence and power despite his youth and relative inexperience. Bhutto aided his president in negotiating the Indus Water Treaty in India in 1960 and next year negotiated an oil-exploration agreement with the Soviet Union, which agreed to provide economic and technical aid to Pakistan.

Foreign Minister 

Bhutto was a Pakistani nationalist and socialist, with particular views on the type of democracy needed in Pakistan. On becoming foreign minister in 1963, his socialist viewpoint influenced him to embark on a close relationship with neighbouring China. At the time, many other countries accepted Taiwan as the legitimate single government of China, at a time when two governments each claimed to be "China". In 1964, the Soviet Union and its satellite states broke off relations with Beijing over ideological differences, and only Albania and Pakistan supported the People's Republic of China. Bhutto staunchly supported Beijing in the UN, and in the UNSC, while also continuing to build bridges to the United States. Bhutto's strong advocacy of developing ties with China came under criticism from the United States. President Lyndon B. Johnson wrote to Bhutto, warning him that further overtures to China would jeopardize congressional support for aid to Pakistan. Bhutto addressed his speeches in a demagogic style and headed the foreign ministry aggressively. His leadership style and his swift rise to power brought him national prominence and popularity. Bhutto and his staff visited Beijing and were warmly received by the Chinese, and Bhutto greeted Mao Zedong with great respect. There, Bhutto helped Ayub negotiate trade and military agreements with the Chinese regime, which agreed to help Pakistan in several military and industrial projects.

Bhutto signed the Sino-Pakistan Boundary Agreement on 2 March 1963 that transferred 750 square kilometres of territory from Pakistan-administered Kashmir to Chinese control. Bhutto asserted his belief in non-alignment, making Pakistan an influential member in non-aligned organisations. Believing in pan-Islamic unity, Bhutto developed closer relations with the likes of Indonesia and Saudi Arabia. Bhutto significantly transformed Pakistan's hitherto pro-West foreign policy. While maintaining a prominent role for Pakistan within the Southeast Asia Treaty Organization and the Central Treaty Organization, Bhutto began asserting a foreign policy course for Pakistan that was independent of U.S. influence. Meanwhile, Bhutto visited both East and West Germany and established a strong link between two countries. Bhutto proceeded economical, technological, industrial and military agreements with Germany. Bhutto strengthened Pakistan's strategic alliance with Germany. Bhutto addressed a farewell speech at the University of Munich, where he cited the importance of Pakistan and German relations. Bhutto then visited Poland and established diplomatic relations in 1962. Bhutto used Pakistan Air Force's Brigadier-General Władysław Turowicz to establish the military and economical link between Pakistan and Poland. Bhutto sought and reached to the Polish community in Pakistan and made a tremendous effort for a fresh avenues for mutual cooperation.

In 1962, as territorial differences increased between India and China, Beijing was planning to stage an invasion in northern territories of India. Premier Zhou Enlai and Mao invited Pakistan to join the raid to rest the State of Jammu and Kashmir from India. Bhutto advocated for the plan, but Ayub opposed the plan: he was afraid of retaliation by Indian troops. Instead Ayub proposed a "joint defence union" with India.  Bhutto was shocked by such statements and felt Ayub Khan was unlettered in international affairs. Bhutto was conscious that despite Pakistan's membership of anti-communist western alliances, China had refrained from criticising Pakistan. In 1962, the U.S. assured Pakistan that “Kashmir issues” will be resolved according to the wishes of Pakistanis and the “Kashmiris”. Therefore, Ayub did not participate in the Chinese plans. Bhutto criticised the U.S. for providing military aid to India during and after the 1962 Sino-Indian War, which was seen as an abrogation of Pakistan's alliance with the United States.

Meanwhile, Ayub Khan, on Bhutto's counsel, launched Operation Gibraltar in a bid to "liberate" Kashmir. It ended in a fiasco and the Indian Armed Forces launched a successful counter-attack on West Pakistan (Indo-Pakistani War of 1965). This war was an aftermath of brief skirmishes that took place between March and August 1965 on the international boundaries in the Rann of Kutch, Jammu and Kashmir and Punjab. Bhutto joined Ayub in Uzbekistan to negotiate a peace treaty with the Indian Prime Minister Lal Bahadur Shastri. Ayub and Shastri agreed to exchange prisoners of war and withdraw respective forces to pre-war boundaries. This agreement was deeply unpopular in Pakistan, causing major political unrest against Ayub's regime. Bhutto's criticism of the final agreement caused a major rift between him and Ayub. Initially denying the rumours, Bhutto resigned in June 1966 and expressed strong opposition to Ayub's regime.

During his term, Bhutto was known to be formulating aggressive geostrategic and foreign policies against India. In 1965, Bhutto's friend Munir Ahmad Khan informed him of the status of India's nuclear programme. Bhutto reportedly said, "Pakistan will fight, fight for a thousand years. If.. India builds the (atom) bomb.... (Pakistan) will eat grass or (leaves), even go hungry, but we (Pakistan) will get one of our own (atom bomb).... We (Pakistan) have no other Choice!". In his 1969 book The Myth of Independence Bhutto argued that it was the “necessity” for Pakistan to acquire the fission weapon, and start a so-called deterrence programme to be able to stand up to the industrialised states, and against a nuclear armed India. Bhutto obtained a manifesto and made a future policy on how the programme would be developed and which individual scientists would start the program. Bhutto selected Munir Ahmad Khan for this

Pakistan Peoples Party 
Following his resignation as foreign minister, large crowds gathered to listen to Bhutto's speech upon his arrival in Lahore on 21 June 1967. Tapping a wave of anger against Ayub, Bhutto traveled across Pakistan to deliver political speeches. In October 1966 Bhutto made explicit the beliefs of his new party, "Islam is our faith, democracy is our policy, socialism is our economy. All power to the people." On 30 November 1967, at the Lahore residence of Mubashir Hassan, a gathering that included Bhutto, Bengali communist J. A. Rahim and Basit Jehangir Sheikh founded the Pakistan Peoples Party (PPP), establishing a strong base in Punjab, Sindh and amongst the Muhajirs.

Mubashir Hassan, an engineering professor at UET Lahore, was the main brain and hidden hand behind the success and the rise of Bhutto. Under Hassan's guidance and Bhutto's leadership, the PPP became a part of the pro-democracy movement involving diverse political parties from all across Pakistan. The PPP activists staged large protests and strikes in different parts of the country, increasing pressure on Ayub to resign. Dr. Hassan and Bhutto's arrest on 12 November 1969, sparked greater political unrest. After his release, Bhutto, joined by key leaders of PPP, attended the Round Table Conference called by Ayub Khan in Rawalpindi, but refused to accept Ayub's continuation in office and the East-Pakistani politician Sheikh Mujibur Rahman's Six point movement for regional autonomy.

Following Ayub's resignation, his successor, General Yahya Khan promised to hold parliamentary elections on 7 December 1970. Under Bhutto's leadership the democratic socialists, leftists, and marxist-communists gathered and united into one party platform for the first time in Pakistan's history. The Socialist-Communist bloc, under Bhutto's leadership, intensified its support in Muhajir and poor farming communities in West Pakistan, working through educating people to cast their vote for their better future. Gathering and uniting the scattered socialist-communist groups in one single center was considered Bhutto's greatest political achievement and as a result, Bhutto's party and other leftists won a large number of seats from constituencies in West-Pakistan. However, Sheikh Mujib's Awami League won an absolute majority in the legislature, receiving more than twice as many votes as Bhutto's PPP. Bhutto strongly refused to accept an Awami League government and infamously threatened to "break the legs" of any elected PPP member who dared to attend the inaugural session of the National Assembly. On 17 January 1971 President Yahya visited Bhutto at his baronial family estate, Al-Murtaza, in Larkana, Sindh, accompanied by Lt. General S. G. M. Pirzada, Principal Staff Officer to President Yahya, and General Abdul Hamid Khan, Commander-in-Chief of the Pakistan Army and Deputy Chief Martial Law Administrator. On February 22, 1971 the generals in West Pakistan took a decision allegedly to crush the Awami League and its supporters. Capitalizing on West Pakistani fears of East Pakistani separatism, Bhutto demanded that Sheikh Mujibur Rahman form a coalition with the PPP. And at some stage proposed "edhar hum, udhar tum", meaning he should govern the West and Mujib should Govern the East. President Yahya postponed the meeting of the national assembly which fueled a popular movement in East Pakistan. Amidst popular outrage in East Pakistan, on 7 March 1971, Sheikh Mujib called the Bengalis to join the struggle for "Bangladesh". According to historical references and a report published by leading Pakistani newspaper The Nation, "Mujib no longer believed in Pakistan and is determined to make Bangladesh". Many also believed that Bhutto wanted power in the West even at the expense of separation of the East. However, Mujib still kept doors open for some sort of settlement in his speech of 7 March. Yahya started a negotiating conference in Dhaka presumably to reach a settlement between Bhutto and Mujib. The discussion was being expected to be "fruitful" until the president left for West Pakistan on the evening of 25 March. On that night of 25 March 1971, the army initiated the "Operation Searchlight", which had been planned by the military junta of Yahya Khan presumably to suppress political activities and movements by the Bengalis. Mujib was arrested and imprisoned in West Pakistan. Genocide and atrocities by the military against the Bengali population were alleged during the operation 

Bhutto stayed in Dacca on the night of 25 March and commented that Pakistan had been saved by the army before leaving on the 26th. While supportive of the army's actions and working to rally international support, Bhutto distanced himself from the Yahya Khan regime and began to criticize Yahya Khan for mishandling the situation. He refused to accept Yahya Khan's scheme to appoint Bengali politician Nurul Amin as Prime Minister, with Bhutto as deputy prime minister. Soon after Bhutto's refusal and continuous resentment toward General Yahya Khan's mishandling of situation, Khan ordered Military Police to arrest Bhutto on charges of treason, quite similar to Mujib. Bhutto was imprisoned in the Adiala Jail along with Mujib, where he was set to face the charges. The army crackdown on the Bengalis of East Pakistan fueled an armed resistance by the Mukti-Bahini (a guerrilla force formed for the campaign of an independent Bangladesh and trained by the Indian army). Pakistan launched an air attack on India in the western border that resulted in the Indian intervention in East Pakistan which led to the very bitter defeat of Pakistani forces, who surrendered on 16 December 1971. Consequently, the state of People's Republic of  Bangladesh was born and Bhutto and others condemned Yahya Khan for failing to protect Pakistan's unity. Isolated, Yahya Khan resigned on 20 December and transferred power to Bhutto, who became president, commander-in-chief and the first civilian chief martial law administrator.

Bhutto was the country's first civilian chief martial law administrator since 1958, as well as the country's first civilian president. With Bhutto assuming the control, the leftists and democratic socialists entered the country's politics, and later emerged as power players in the country's politics. And, for the first time in the country's history, the leftists and democratic socialists had a chance to administer the country with the popular vote and widely approved exclusive mandate, given to them by the West's population in the 1970s elections.

In a reference written by Kuldip Nayar in his book "Scoop! Inside Stories from the Partition to the Present", Nayar noted that "Bhutto's releasing of Mujib did not mean anything to Pakistan's policy as in if there was no liberation war. Bhutto's policy, and even as of today, the policy of Pakistan continues to state that "she will continue to fight for the honor and integrity of Pakistan. East Pakistan is an inseparable and unseverable part of Pakistan".

President of Pakistan 
A Pakistan International Airlines flight was sent to fetch Bhutto from New York, who at that time was presenting Pakistan's case before the United Nations Security Council on the East Pakistan Crises. Bhutto returned home on 18 December 1971. On 20 December, he was taken to the President House in Rawalpindi, where he took over two positions from Yahya Khan, one as president and the other as first civilian Chief Martial Law Administrator. Thus, he was the first civilian Chief Martial Law Administrator of the dismembered Pakistan. By the time Bhutto had assumed control of what remained of Pakistan, the nation was completely isolated, angered, and demoralized. Bhutto addressing the nation through radio and television said:

My dear countrymen, my dear friends, my dear students, labourers, peasants... those who fought for Pakistan... We are facing the worst crisis in our country's life, a deadly crisis. We have to pick up the pieces, very small pieces, but we will make a new Pakistan, a prosperous and progressive Pakistan, a Pakistan free of exploitation, a Pakistan envisaged by the Quaid-e-Azam.

As president, Bhutto faced mounting challenges on both internal and foreign fronts. The trauma was severe in Pakistan, a psychological setback and emotional breakdown for Pakistan. The two-nation theory—the theoretical basis for the creation of Pakistan—lay discredited, and Pakistan's foreign policy collapsed when no moral support was found anywhere, including long-standing allies such as the U.S. and China. However this is disputed even by Bangladeshi academics who insist that the two-nation theory was not discredited.  Since her creation, the physical and moral existence of Pakistan was in great danger. On the internal front, Baloch, Sindhi, Punjabi, and Pashtun nationalisms were at their peak, calling for their independence from Pakistan. Finding it difficult to keep Pakistan united, Bhutto launched full-fledged intelligence and military operations to stamp out any separatist movements. By the end of 1978, these nationalist organizations were brutally quelled by Pakistan Armed Forces.

Bhutto immediately placed Yahya Khan under house arrest, brokered a ceasefire and ordered the release of Sheikh Mujib, who was held prisoner by the Pakistan Army. To implement this, Bhutto reversed the verdict of Mujib's earlier court-martial trial, in which Brigadier-General Rahimuddin Khan had sentenced Mujib to death. Appointing a new cabinet, Bhutto appointed Lieutenant-General Gul Hasan as Chief of Army Staff. On 2 January 1972 Bhutto announced the nationalisation of all major industries, including iron and steel, heavy engineering, heavy electricals, petrochemicals, cement and public utilities. A new labour policy was announced increasing workers' rights and the power of trade unions. Although he came from a feudal background himself, Bhutto announced his first reforms in 1972 which is also called Martial Law Regulation (MLR-115). As Bhutto came as Populist leader, his charismatic politics was evident. Consequently, he put ceiling on land ownership wherein no one can hold more than 200 acres irrigated and more than 300 acres non-irrigated land. Bhutto also dismissed the military chiefs on 3 March after they refused orders to suppress a major police strike in Punjab. He appointed General Tikka Khan as the new Chief of the Army Staff in March 1972 as he felt the general would not interfere in political matters and would concentrate on rehabilitating the Pakistan Army. Bhutto convened the National Assembly on 14 April, rescinded martial law on 21 April and charged the legislators with writing a new constitution.

Bhutto visited India to meet Prime Minister Indira Gandhi and negotiated a formal peace agreement and the release of 93,000 Pakistani prisoners of war. The two leaders signed the Simla Agreement, which committed both nations to establish a new-yet-temporary Line of Control in Kashmir and obligated them to resolve disputes peacefully through bilateral talks. Bhutto also promised to hold a future summit for the peaceful resolution of the Kashmir dispute and pledged to recognise Bangladesh. Although he secured the release of Pakistani soldiers held by India, Bhutto was criticised by many in Pakistan for allegedly making too many concessions to India. It is theorised that Bhutto feared his downfall if he could not secure the release of Pakistani soldiers and the return of territory occupied by Indian forces. Bhutto established an atomic power development programme and inaugurated the first Pakistani atomic reactor, built in collaboration with Canada in Karachi on 28 November. On 30 March 59 military officers were arrested by army troops for allegedly plotting a coup against Bhutto, who appointed then-Brigadier Muhammad Zia-ul-Haq to head a military tribunal to investigate and try the suspects. The National Assembly approved the new 1973 Constitution, which Bhutto signed into effect on 12 April. The constitution proclaimed an "Islamic Republic" in Pakistan with a parliamentary form of government. On 10 August, Bhutto turned over the post of president to Fazal Ilahi Chaudhry, assuming the office of prime minister instead.

Nuclear weapons program 

Zulfiqar Ali Bhutto was the founder of Pakistan's atomic bomb programme, and due to his administration and aggressive leadership of this programme, he is often known as the Father of Nuclear deterrence programme. Bhutto's interest in nuclear technology was said to have begun during his college years in the United States when Bhutto attended a course in political science, discussing the political impact of the U.S.'s first nuclear test, Trinity, on global politics. While at Berkeley, Bhutto witnessed the public panic when the Soviet Union first exploded their bomb, codename First Lightning in 1949, prompting the U.S. government to launch their research on 'hydrogen' bombs. However, long before in 1958, as Minister for Fuel, Power, and National Resources, Bhutto played a key role in setting up the Pakistan Atomic Energy Commission (PAEC) administrative research bodies and institutes. Soon, Bhutto offered a technical post to Munir Ahmad Khan in PAEC in 1958, and lobbied for Abdus Salam to be appointed as Science Adviser in 1960. Before being elevated to Foreign Minister, Bhutto directed the funds for key research in nuclear weapons and related science.

In October 1965, as the Foreign Minister Bhutto visited Vienna, where nuclear engineer Munir Ahmad Khan working at a senior technical post at the IAEA. Munir Khan informed him of the status of the Indian nuclear programme and the options Pakistan had to develop its own nuclear capability. Both agreed on the need for Pakistan to develop a nuclear deterrent to counter India. While, Munir Khan had failed to convince Ayub Khan, Bhutto had said to Munir Khan: "Don't worry, our turn will come". Shortly after the 1965 war Bhutto, at a press conference,  declared that "even if we have to eat grass, we will make nuclear bomb. We have no other choice." as he saw India was making its way toward developing the bomb. In 1965, Bhutto lobbied for Salam and succeeded in appointing Salam as the head of Pakistan's delegation at IAEA, and helped Salam to lobby for acquiring nuclear power plants. In November 1972, Bhutto advised Salam to travel to the United States to evade the war, and advised him to return with the key literature on nuclear weapons history. By the end week of December 1972, Salam returned to Pakistan, loaded with literature on the Manhattan Project in huge suitcases. In 1974, Bhutto launched a more aggressive and serious diplomatic offensive on the United States and the Western world over the nuclear issues. Writing to the world and Western leaders, Bhutto made it clear and maintained:

Roughly two weeks after experiencing the 1971 winter war, on 20 January 1972 Bhutto rallied a conference of nuclear scientists and engineers at Multan. While at the Multan meeting scientists were wondering why the President, who had so much on his hands in those trying days, was paying so much attention to the scientists and engineers in the nuclear field. At the meeting Bhutto slowly talked about the recent war and the country's future, pointing out the existence of the country was in great mortal danger. While the academicians listened to Bhutto carefully, Bhutto said: "Look, we're going to have the bomb". Bhutto asked them: "Can you give it to me? And how long will it take it to make a bomb?" Many of senior scientists had witnessed the war, and were emotionally and psychologically disturbed, therefore, the response was positive when the senior academic scientists replied: "Oh...Yes.. Yes... You can have it." There was a lively debate on the time needed to make the bomb, and finally one scientist dared to say that maybe it could be done in five years. Prime Minister Bhutto smiled, lifted his hand, and dramatically thrust forward three fingers and said: "Three years, I want it in three years." The atmosphere suddenly became electric. It was then that one of the junior scientist Siddique Ahmad Butt (a theoretical physicist), who under Munir Khan's guiding hand would come to play a major role in making the fission weapon possible – jumped to his feet and clamoured for his leader's attention. Siddique Ahmad Butt replied: "It can be done in three years." When Bhutto heard Butt's reply, Bhutto was very much amused and said: "Well.... Much as I appreciate your enthusiasm, this is a very serious political decision, which Pakistan must make, and perhaps all Third World countries must make one day, because it is coming. So can you boys do it?". Nearly all senior scientists replied in one tone: Yes... We can do it, given the resources and given the facilities." Bhutto ended the meeting by simply saying: "I shall find you the resources and I shall find you the facilities."

Before the 1970s, the nuclear deterrence was long established under the government of Huseyn Shaheed Suhrawardy, but was completely peaceful and devoted to civilian power needs. Bhutto, in his book The Myth of Independence in 1969 wrote that:

After India's nuclear test – codename Smiling Buddha—in May 1974, Bhutto sensed and saw this test as final anticipation for Pakistan's death. In a press conference, held shortly after India's nuclear test, Bhutto said, "India's nuclear program is designed to intimidate Pakistan and establish "hegemony in the subcontinent". Despite Pakistan's limited financial resources, Bhutto was so enthusiastic about the nuclear energy project, that he is reported to have said "Pakistanis will eat grass but make a nuclear bomb."

The Pakistan Atomic Energy Commission's militarisation was initiated on 20 January 1972 and, in its initial years, was implemented by Pakistan Army's Chief of Army Staff General Tikka Khan. The Karachi Nuclear Power Plant (KANUPP-I) was inaugurated by Bhutto during his role as the President of Pakistan at the end of 1972. The nuclear weapons programme was set up loosely based on the Manhattan Project of the 1940s under the administrative control of Bhutto. And, senior academic scientists had direct access to Bhutto, who kept him informed about every inch of the development. Bhutto's Science Advisor, Abdus Salam's office was also sat up in Bhutto's Prime minister Secretariat. On Bhutto's request, Salam had established and led the Theoretical Physics Group (TPG) that marked the beginning of the nuclear deterrent programme. The TPG designed and developed the nuclear weapons as well as the entire programme. Later, Munir Ahmad Khan had him personally approved the budget for the development of the programme.

Wanting a capable administrator, Bhutto sought Lieutenant-General Rahimuddin Khan to chair the commission, which Rahimuddin declined, in 1971. Instead, in January 1972, Bhutto chose a U.S.-trained nuclear engineer, Munir Khan, as chairman of the Pakistan Atomic Energy Commission (PAEC) as Bhutto realised he wanted an administrator who understood the scientific and economical needs of this technologically ambitious programme. Since 1965, Munir Khan had developed an extremely close and trusted relationship with Bhutto, and even after his death, Benazir and Murtaza Bhutto were instructed by their father to keep in touch with Munir Khan. In spring of 1976, Kahuta Research Facility, then known as Engineering Research Laboratories (ERL), as part of codename Project-706, was also established by Bhutto, and brought under nuclear scientist Abdul Qadeer Khan and the Pakistan Army Corps of Engineers' Lieutenant-General Zahid Ali Akbar.

Because Pakistan, under Bhutto, was not a signatory or party of the Nuclear Non-Proliferation Treaty (NPT), the Nuclear Suppliers Group (NSG), Commissariat à l'énergie atomique (CEA), and British Nuclear Fuels (BNFL) had immediately cancelled fuel reprocessing plant projects with PAEC. And, according to Causar Nyäzie, the Pakistan Atomic Energy Commission officials had misled Bhutto and he sought on a long journey to try to get nuclear fuel reprocessing plant from France. It was on the advice of A. Q. Khan that no fuel existed to reprocess and urged Bhutto to follow his pursuit of uranium enrichment. Bhutto tried to show he was still interested in that expensive route and was relieved when Kissinger persuaded the French to cancel the deal. Bhutto had trusted Munir Ahmad Khan's plans to develop the programme ingeniously, and the mainstream goal of showing such interest in French reprocessing plant was to give time to PAEC scientists to gain expertise in building its own reprocessing plants. By the time France's CEA cancelled the project, the PAEC had acquired 95% of the detailed plans of the plant and materials.

Munir Ahmad Khan and Ishfaq Ahmad believed that since PAEC had acquired most of the detailed plans, work, plans, and materials, the PAEC, based on that 95% work, could build the plutonium reprocessing reactors on its own, Pakistan should stick to its original plan, the plutonium route. Bhutto did not disagree but saw an advantage in establishing another parallel programme, the uranium enrichment programme under Abdul Qadeer Khan. Both Munir Khan and Ahmed had shown their concern over on Abdul Qadeer Khan's suspected activities but Bhutto backed Khan when Bhutto maintained that: "No less than any other nation did what Abdul Qadeer Khan (is) doing; the Soviets and Chinese; the British and the French; the Indians and the Israelis; stole the nuclear weapons designs previously in the past and no one questioned them but rather tend to be quiet. We are not stealing what they (illegally) stole in the past (as referring the nuclear weapon designs) but we're taking a small machine which is not useful for making the atomic bomb but for a fuel". International pressure was difficult to counter at that time, and Bhutto, with the help of Munir Ahmad Khan and Aziz Ahmed, tackled the intense heated criticism and diplomatic war with the United States at numerous fronts—while the progress on nuclear weapons remained highly classified. During this pressure, Aziz Ahmed played a significant role by convincing the consortium industries to sell and export sensitive electronic components before the United States could approach to them and try and prevent the consortium industries to export such equipments and components. Bhutto slowly reversed and thwarted United States' any attempt to infiltrate the programme as he had expelled many of the American diplomatic officials in the country, under Operation Sun Rise, authorised by Bhutto under ISI. On the other hand, Bhutto intensified his staunch support and eye-blindly backed Abdul Qadeer Khan to quietly bring the Urenco's weapon-grade technology to Pakistan, keeping the Kahuta Laboratories hidden from the outside world. Regional rivals such as India and Soviet Union, had no basic intelligence on Pakistan's nuclear energy project during the 1970s, and Bhutto's intensified clandestine efforts seemed to be paid off in 1978 when the programme was fully matured.

In a thesis written in The Myth of Independence, Bhutto argued that nuclear weapons would allow India to use its Air Force warplanes with small battlefield nuclear devices against the Pakistan Army cantonments, armoured and infantry columns and PAF bases and nuclear and military industrial facilities. The Indian Air Force would not meet with an adverse reaction from the world community as long as civilian casualties could be kept to a minimum. This way, India would defeat Pakistan, force its armed forces into a humiliating surrender and occupy and annexe the Northern Areas of Pakistan and Azad Kashmir. India would then carve up Pakistan into tiny states based on ethnic divisions and that would be the end of the "Pakistan problem" once and for all.

By the time Bhutto was ousted, this crash programme had fully matured in terms of technical development as well as scientific efforts. By the 1977, PAEC and KRL had built their uranium enrichment and plutonium reprocessing plants, and selection for test sites, at Chagai Hills, was done by the PAEC. The feasibility reports were submitted by both organisations on their works. In 1977, the PAEC's Theoretical Physics Group had finished the designing of the first fission weapon, and KRL scientists succeeded in electromagnetic isotope separation of Uranium fissile isotopes. In spite of this, still little had been done in the development of weapons, and Pakistan's nuclear arsenal were actually made by General Zia-ul-Haq's military regime, under the watchful eyes of several Naval admirals, Army and Air Force's generals including Ghulam Ishaq Khan. In 1983, Bhutto's decision later proved to be right, when PAEC had conducted a cold test, near Kirana Hills, evidently made from non-fissioned plutonium. It has been speculated recently in the press that Dr. Khan's uranium enrichment designs were used by the Chinese in exchange for uranium hexafluoride (UF6) and some highly enriched weapons grade uranium. Later on this weapons grade uranium was offered back to the Chinese as the Pakistanis used their own materials. In all, Bhutto knew that Pakistan had become a nuclear weapon state in 1978 when his friend Munir Ahmad Khan paid a visit to him in his jail cell. There, Munir Ahmad Khan told Bhutto that the process of weapon designing is finished and a milestone in the complex and difficult enrichment of weapon-grade fuel has been achieved by the PAEC and dr. Abdul Qadeer Khan of ERL. Bhutto called for an immediate nuclear test to be conducted, no response was issued by General Zia or any member of his government.

Prime Minister of Pakistan 
Bhutto was sworn in as the prime minister of the country on 14 August 1973, after he had secured 108 votes in a house of 146 members. Fazal Ilahi Chaudhry was elected as the president under the new constitution. During his five years of government, the Bhutto government made extensive reforms at every level of government. Pakistan's capital and Western reforms that were begun and built in 1947 throughout the 1970s, were transformed and replaced with socialist system. His policies were seen people friendly but did not produce long-lasting effects as the civil disorder against Bhutto began to take place in 1977.

Constitutional reforms 

Bhutto is considered the main architect of 1973 constitution as part of his vision to put Pakistan to road to parliamentary democracy. One of the major achievements in Bhutto's life was drafting of Pakistan's first ever consensus constitution to the country. Bhutto supervised the promulgation of 1973 constitution that triggered an unstoppable constitutional revolution through his politics wedded to the emancipation of the downtrodden masses, by first giving people a voice in the Parliament, and introducing radical changes in the economic sphere for their benefit.

During his period in office the government carried out seven major amendments to the 1973 Constitution. The First Amendment led to Pakistan's recognition of and diplomatic ties with Bangladesh. The Second Amendment in the constitution declared the Ahmadis as non-Muslims, and defined the term non-Muslim. The rights of the detained were limited under the Third Amendment while the powers and jurisdiction of the courts for providing relief to political opponents were curtailed under the Fourth Amendment. The Fifth Amendment passed on 15 September 1976, focused on curtailing the power and jurisdiction of the Judiciary. This amendment was highly criticised by lawyers and political leaders. The main provision of the Sixth Amendment extended the term of the Chief Justices of the Supreme Court and the High Courts beyond the age of retirement. This Amendment was made in the Constitution to favour the then Chief Justice of the Supreme Court who was supposed to be a friend of Bhutto.

Industrial reforms 
The Bhutto government carried out a number of reforms in the industrial sector. His reforms were twofold: nationalization, and the improvement of workers' rights. In the first phase, basic industries like steel, chemical and cement were nationalized. This was done in 1972. The next major step in nationalization took place on 1 January 1974, when Bhutto nationalised all banks. The last step in the series was the nationalization of all flour, rice and cotton mills throughout the country. This nationalisation process was not as successful as Bhutto expected. Most of the nationalized units were small businesses that could not be described as industrial units, hence making no sense for the step that was taken. Consequently, a considerable number of small businessmen and traders were ruined, displaced or rendered unemployed. In the concluding analysis, nationalisation caused colossal loss not only to the national treasury but also to the people of Pakistan.

The Bhutto government established a large number of rural and urban schools, including around 6,500 elementary schools, 900 middle schools, 407 high schools, 51 intermediate colleges and 21 junior colleges. Bhutto also abandoned the Western education system and most of the literature was sent back to Western world; instead his government encouraged the local academicians to publish books on their respected fields. Though the local books were made cheaper to the public, these reforms came with controversy. His government made Islamic and Pakistan studies compulsory in schools. Book banks were created in most institutions and over 400,000 copies of text-books were supplied to students.

Bhutto is credited for establishing the world class Quaid-e-Azam University and Allama Iqbal Open University in Islamabad in 1974, as well as establishing Gomal University Dera Ismail Khan in 1973. In his role as Foreign Minister, and in 1967 with the help of Abdus Salam, established the Institute of Theoretical Physics. As Prime Minister, Bhutto made revolutionary efforts to expand the web of education. Bhutto established the Allama Iqbal Medical College in 1975. In 1974, with the help of Abdus Salam, Bhutto gave authorisation of the International Nathiagali Summer College on Contemporary Physics (INSC) at the Nathiagali and as even as of today, INSC conference is still held on Pakistan, where thousands of scientists from all over the world are delegated to Pakistan to interact with Pakistan's academic scientists. In 1976, Bhutto established the Engineering Council, Institute of Theoretical Physics, Pakistan Academy of Letters and Cadet college Razmak in North Waziristan. A further four new Universities which have been established at Multan, Bahawalpur, and Khairpur. The People's Open University is another innovative venture which has started functioning from Islamabad. The Government's Education Policy provides for the remission of fees and the grant of a number of scholarships for higher education to the children of low-paid employees

Seven thousand new hostel seats were planned to be added to the existing accommodation after the 1977 election. Bhutto said in 1975 he was aware "of the difficulties and deficiencies faced by college students in many of the existing hostels. Directions have, therefore, been issued that fans, water-coolers and pay-telephones must be provided in each and every hostel in as short a time as physically possible."

Land, flood and agriculture reforms 
During his period as prime minister, a number of land reforms were also introduced. The important land reforms included the reduction of land ceilings and introducing the security of tenancy to tenant farmers. Another step that Bhutto took was to democratise Pakistan's Civil Service. In Balochistan, the pernicious practice of Shishak and Sardari System was abolished. In 1976, the Bhutto government carried out the establishment of Federal Flood Commission (FFC), and was tasked to prepare national flood protection plans, and flood forecasting and research to harness floodwater. Bhutto later went on to upgrade a number of dams and barrages built in Sindh Province.

Bhutto was a strong advocate of empowering small farmers. He argued that if farmers were weak and demoralised then Pakistan's agricultural strength would be fragile, believing that farmers would not feel psychologically safe unless the country achieved self-sufficiency in food. Therefore, the Bhutto government launched programs to put the country on road to self-sufficiency in rice hulling, sugar-milling and wheat husking industries. Bhutto's government intensified the control of rice hulling, sugar and wheat husking factories, initially believing that public sector involvement would reduce the influence of multi-national corporations creating monopolies. The Government initiated schemes for combating water logging and salinity. Tax exceptions were also introduced for small landowners to encourage the growth of agriculture. His nationalisation of Sindh-based industries heavily benefited the poor, but badly upset the influential feudal lords.

Economic policy 

Bhutto introduced socialist economics while working to prevent any further division of the country. Major heavy mechanical, chemical, and electrical engineering industries were immediately nationalised by Bhutto, and all of the industries came under direct control of government. Industries, such as Karachi Electric Supply Corporation (KSEC) were under complete government control with no private influence in KESC decision. Bhutto abandoned Ayub Khan's state capitalism policies, and introduced socialist policies in a move to reduce income inequality. Bhutto also established the Port Qasim, Pakistan Steel Mills, the Heavy Mechanical Complex (HMC) and several cement factories. However, the growth rate of economy relative to that of the 1960s when East Pakistan was still part of Pakistan and large generous aid from the United States declined, after the global oil crises in 1973, which also had a negative impact on the economy. Despite the initiatives undertaken by Bhutto's government to boost the country's economy, the economical growth remained at equilibrium level. But Bhutto's policy largely benefited the poor and working class when the level of absolute poverty was sharply reduced, with the percentage of the population estimated to be living in absolute poverty falling from 46.50% by the end of 1979–80, under the General Zia-ul-Haq's military rule, to 30.78%. The land reform programme provided increased economic support to landless tenants, and development spending was substantially increased, particularly on health and education, in both rural and urban areas, and provided "material support" to rural wage workers, landless peasants, and urban wage workers.

Bhutto's nationalisation policies were initiated with an aim to put workers in control of the tools of production and to protect workers and small businesses. However, economical historians argued that the nationalisation program initially effected the small industries and had devastating effects on Pakistan's economy shrunk Bhutto's credibility. Conservative critics believed the nationalisation policies had damaged investor's confidence and government corruption in nationalised industries grew, although no serious corruption cases were ever proved against Bhutto by the military junta. In 1974, Bhutto maintained that foreign companies and industries in Pakistan were except from nationalisation policies and his government would be willing to receive foreign investment to put up factories. While commenting on his policies in 1973, Bhutto told the group of investors that belonged to the Lahore Chamber of Commerce and Industry (LCCI) that "activity of public sector or state sector prevents the concentration of economic power in few hands, and protects the small and medium entrepreneurs from the clutches of giant enterprises and vested interests."

Bhutto's shift away from some socialist policies badly upset his democratic socialist alliance and many in the Pakistan Peoples Party, many of his colleagues, most notable Malik Meraj Khalid left Bhutto and departed to Soviet Union after resigning from Law Minister. Continuous disagreement led the government's socialist alliance to collapse and further uniting with secular Independence Movement led by Asghar Khan.

As part of his investment policies, Bhutto founded the National Development Finance Corporation (NDFC). In July 1973, this financial institute began operation with an initial government investment of 100 million PRs. It aim was finance public sector industrial enterprises but, later on, its charter was modified to provide finance to the private sector as well. The NDFC is currently the largest development finance institution of Pakistan performing diversified activities in the field of industrial financing and investment banking. 42 projects financed by NDFC have contributed Rs. 10,761 million to Pakistan's GDP and generated Rs. 690 million after-tax profits and 40,465 jobs. By the mid-1990s NDFC had a pool of resources amounting to US$878 million The Bhutto government increased the level of investment, private and public, in the economy from less than Rs. 7,000 million in 1971–72 to more than Rs. 17,000 million in 1974–75.

Banking and Export expansion 

Banking reforms were introduced to provide more opportunities to small farmers and business such as forcing banks to ensure 70% of institutional lending should be for small land holders of 12.5 acres or less, which was a revolutionary idea at a time when banks only clients were the privileged classes. The number of bank branches rose by 75% from December 1971 to November 1976, from 3,295 to 5,727. It was one of the most radical move made by Bhutto, and the Bank infrastructure was expanded covering all towns and villages with a population of 5,000 in accordance with targets set after the nationalisation of banks.

By end of the Bhutto government concentration of wealth had declined compared to height of the Ayub Khan era when 22 families owned 66% of industrial capital, and also controlled banking and 97% of insurance.

Measures taken in the first few months of 1972 set a new framework for the revival of the economy. The diversion of trade from East Pakistan to international markets was completed within a short period. By 1974, exports exceeded one billion dollars, showing a 60% increase over the combined exports of East and West Pakistan before separation, it was achieved and benefited from when the world was in the midst of the major 1973 oil crisis and in the middle of global recession
the national income of Pakistan increased by 15% and industrial production by as much as 20% in four years.

Balochistan

Military operation 

Following the secession of East Pakistan, calls for the independence of Balochistan by Baloch nationalists grew immensely. Surveying the political instability, Bhutto's central government sacked two provincial governments within six months, arrested the two chief ministers, two governors and forty-four MNAs and MPAs, obtained an order from the Supreme Court banning the National People's Party on the recommendation of Akbar Bugti, and charged everyone with high treason to be tried by a specially constituted Hyderabad tribunal of hand-picked judges.

In January 1973, Bhutto ordered the Pakistan Armed Forces to suppress a rising insurgency in the province of Balochistan. He dismissed the governments in Balochistan and the North-West Frontier Province once more. Following the alleged discovery of Iraqi arms in Islamabad in February 1973, Bhutto dissolved the Provincial Assembly of Balochistan. The operation, under General Tikka Khan, soon took shape in a five-year conflict with the Baloch separatists. The sporadic fighting between the insurgency and the army started in 1973 with the largest confrontation taking place in September 1974. Later on, Pakistan Navy, under Vice-Admiral Patrick Julius Simpson, also jumped in the conflict as it had applied naval blockades to Balochistan's port. The Navy began its separate operations to seized the shipments sent to aid Baloch separatists. Pakistan Air Force also launched air operations, and with the support of navy and army, the air force had pounded the mountainous hidden havens of the Separatists. The Iranian military, also fearing a spread of the greater Baloch resistance in Iran, aided the Pakistani military as well. Among Iran's contribution were 30 Huey cobra attack helicopters and $200 million in aid.

Iraqi intervention 

Iraq under Sunni President Saddam Hussein sent Iraqi made weapons to Pakistan's warm water ports. Pakistan's navy mounted an effective blockade. Saddam's government provided support for Baluchi separatists in Pakistan, hoping their conflict would spread to rival Iran. In 1973, Iraq provided the Baluchis with conventional arms, and it opened an office for the Baluchistan Liberation Front (BLF) in Baghdad. This operation was supposed to be covert, but in 1973, the operation was exposed by M.I. when senior separatist leader Akbar Bugti defected to Bhutto, revealing a series of arms stored in the Iraqi Embassy. On the midnight of 9 February 1973, Bhutto launched an operation to seize control of the Iraqi Embassy, and preparation for siege was hastily prepared. The operation was highly risky and a wrong step could have started a war between the two countries. The operation was carefully analysed and at 0:00hrs (12:00 am), the SSG Division accompanied by Army Rangers stormed the Embassy. Military Police arrested the Iraqi Ambassador, the military attaché, and Iraq's diplomatic staff. Following the incident, authorities discovered 300 Soviet sub-machine guns with 50,000 rounds of ammunition and a large amount of money that was to be distributed amongst Baluchi separatist groups. Bhutto was angered and frustrated. Without demanding an explanation, he ordered the Military Police to immediately expel the Iraqi Ambassador and his staff as persona non grata on the first available flight.

The government announced the Iraqi plan to further dismember the country, and Bhutto's successful diplomatic offensive against Iraq isolated Saddam internationally with global condemnation. This incident caused Pakistan to support Iran during the Iran–Iraq War in the 1980s.

Aftermath 

In order to avoid a replay of the East-Pakistan war, Bhutto launched economic and political reforms in the midst of the conflict. Bhutto government abolished the feudal system, the feudal lords continued to appropriate to themselves a generous share of government developmental funds whilst at the same time, they opposed and blackmailed the government whenever they could. Gradually the tribesmen started coming out of the Sardars' quarantine. Modern amenities, for instance medical aid, automobiles for passenger transport and schooling of children became available in the interior of Baluchistan for the first time, since 1947. The Bhutto government also constructed 564 miles of new roads, including the key link between Sibi and Maiwand creating new trade and commerce centres.

Passport reforms 
Bhutto government gave the right of a passport to every citizen of Pakistan and facilitated millions of skilled and non-skilled Pakistanis to seek employment in the Gulf countries through a signing a number combination of bilateral agreements. From Khyber Pakhtunkhwa, alone 35,000 workers were given the opportunity to work in the United Arab Emirates and Saudi Arabia. Bhutto used the Pakistani community of London to lobby and influence European governments to improve the rights of expatriate Pakistani communities in Europe. The remittances from overseas Pakistanis, which now total around $US25 billion per annum, constitute a dependable source of foreign exchange for Pakistan.

Labour policy and social security 

The labour policy was among the most important cornerstones of Bhutto's government and a comprehensive labour reforms initiated by the Bhutto government. Shortly after assuming control, Bhutto's government imposed some conditions on the dismissal of workers. In 1973, the government instituted Labour Courts for the speedy redress of workers' grievances and the government also introduced a scheme for workers' participation in management, through the nationalisation policy. This scheme provided for 20% participation by workers in management committees set up at factory level. The Government abolished the workers' contribution to the Social Security Fund; instead, the employers were made to increase their contribution from 4 to 6%. The government enhanced compensation rates under the Worker's Compensation Act.

In 1972 the Bhutto government initially provided for some old age benefits for workers through group insurance, increased rates of compensation and higher rates of gratuity. However, the policy did not benefited immediately, therefore, the government introduced a pension scheme of old age benefits which would provide a payment of Rs.75 a month to workers after retirement at the age of 55 for men and 50 for women, on condition that the worker had completed a minimum of 15 years insurable employment. This applied to all factories, industries, and establishments employing ten or more workers drawing monthly wages up to Rs. 1,000. Skilled workers who become invalid after five years of insurable employment were also made entitled to benefits under this scheme.

Bhutto did not want to go for the western model where workers generally contribute along with the employers towards their old age benefits. In view of Pakistan's conditions, Bhutto's government did not wish the financial burden of this scheme to fall even partly on the worker. It was decided that the scheme be founded through a contribution from employers to the extent of 5% of the wage bill.

Foreign policy 

After assuming power, Bhutto sought to diversify Pakistan's relations away from the United States and, soon Pakistan left CENTO and SEATO. Bhutto developed close and strengthened the Arab relations, and Sino-Pak relations. Bhutto believed in an independent Foreign Policy which had hitherto been the hand maiden of the Western Power, particularly independent from the United States' sphere of influence. With Bhutto as Foreign minister, and Prime minister, Pakistan and Iran had cemented a special relationship, as Iran had provided military assistance to Pakistan. The Sino-Pak relations were immensely improved, and Pakistan, under Bhutto, had built a strategic relationship with People's Republic of China, when PRC was isolated. In 1974, Bhutto hosted the second Organisation of the Islamic Conference (OIC) in 1974 where he delegated and invited leaders from the Muslim world to Lahore, Punjab Province of Pakistan. Bhutto was a strong advocate of Afro-Asian Solidarity and had cemented ties with Afro-Asian and Islamic countries and by 1976 had emerged as the Leader of the Third World.

Bhutto sought a peace agreement—Simla Agreement—with Indira Gandhi, Premier of India, and brought back 93,000 P.O.Ws to Pakistan and secured  held by India without compromising on Kashmir stance or recognising Bangladesh which were the key Indian demands. Negotiating with a power that has dismembered the country was an open-challenge to Bhutto who smoothly convinced India to return the territory and the POWs back to Pakistan. Before this conference, Bhutto and his colleagues did the comprehensive homework as Bhutto had realised that Arabs had still not succeeded in regaining territory lost in the 1967 war with Israel. Therefore, capturing of land does not cry out for international attention the same way as the prisoners do. According to Benazir Bhutto, Bhutto demanded the control of the territory in the first stage of the Agreement which surprised and shocked the Indian delegation. In Bhutto's point of view, the POW problem was more of a humanitarian problem that could be tackled at any time, but the territorial problem was something that could be integrated in India as time elapses. Indian Premier Gandhi was stunned and astonished at Bhutto's demand and reacted immediately by refusing Bhutto's demand. However, Bhutto calmed her and negotiated with economic packages dealt with Gandhi. Bhutto's knowledge and his intellectualism impressed Gandhi personally that Gandhi agreed to give the territory back to Bhutto in a first stage of the agreement. Signing of this agreement with Pakistan paying small price is still considered Bhutto's one of the huge diplomatic success.

His vast knowledge, intelligence, and keen awareness of post-World War II, and the nuclear history, enabled him to craft the foreign policy which brought unmatched undivideds in Pakistan's foreign policy history. Elements of his policy were continued by the successive governments to play a vital role in world's politics. In 1974, Bhutto and his Foreign minister Aziz Ahmed brought a U.N. resolution, recommending and calling for the establishment of nuclear-weapon free zone in South Asia, whilst he and Aziz Ahmed aggressively attacked the Indian nuclear programme. While Abdul Qadeer Khan was tasked with bringing the gas-centrifuge technology through the means of atomic proliferation, the goal of the resolution was achieved when Bhutto put India on the defensive position and promoted Pakistan as a non-proliferationist.

East Asia 
Since the 1960s, Bhutto had been an anti-SEATO and preferred a non-aligned policy. Soon after assuming the office, Bhutto took a lengthy foreign trip to Southeast Asia, seeking closer and tighter relations with Vietnam, Thailand, Laos, Burma, and North Korea. His policy largely followed a tight and closer relations with China, normalised relationships with Soviet Union, built an Islamic bloc, and advocated a creation of new economical alliance largely benefiting the third and second world countries.

All of these initiations and implications had disastrous effects on Japan, prompting Japan to oppose Bhutto, although Bhutto was a great admirer of Japan even though Japan was not a constituent part of Bhutto's foreign policy. In the 1970s, Japan made several attempts to get close to Bhutto, sending its military officials, scientists, and parliamentary delegations to Pakistan. Hence Japan went far by condemning India for carrying out a nuclear test, Smiling Buddha, in 1974, and publicly supported Pakistan's non-nuclear weapon policy and pledged to build several new nuclear power plants. In 1970, Bhutto advised Japan not to be party of NPT, but Japan signed it but later regretted for not being properly progressed.

In Bhutto's view, Japan had been under the United States' influence, and much bigger role of Japan in Asia would only benefit American interests in the region. By the 1970s, Japan completely lost its momentum in Pakistan as Pakistan followed a strict independent policy. Bhutto envisioned Pakistan's new policy as benefiting the economic relations rather than the military alliance which also affected Japan's impact on Pakistan. However, much of the foreign policy efforts were reverted by General Zia-ul-Haq and ties were finally restored after Bhutto's execution.

Arab world and Israel 
Bhutto sought to improve Pakistan's ties with the Arab world, and sided with the Arab world during the Arab-Israeli conflict. Colonel Gaddafi of former Socialist Libya considered Bhutto as one of his greatest inspirations and was said to be very fond of Bhutto's intellectualism. In 1973, during the Yom Kippur War, Pakistan's relations with the Arab world represented a watershed. In both Pakistan and the Arab world, Pakistan's swift, unconditional and forthright offer of assistance to the Arab states was deeply appreciated.
In 1974, pressured by other Muslim nations, Pakistan eventually recognised Bangladesh as Mujib stated he would only go to the OIC conference in Lahore if Pakistan recognised Bangladesh. Pakistan established full diplomatic relations with Bangladesh on 18 January 1976 and relations improved in the following decades. Bhutto aided the Syrian and Egyptian Air Force by sending the Pakistan Air Force and Navy's top fighter pilots where they flew combat missions against Israel. However, Iraq was not benefited with Bhutto policies.

In early 1977, Bhutto decided to use ISI to provide the credible intelligence on Iraqi nuclear program that Pakistan and the ISI had secretly gained. The government passed intel that identified Iraqi nuclear program and the Osirak Nuclear Reactor at Osirak to Israel's Mossad. Helping Israel to infiltrate Iraqi nuclear program was also continued by General Zia-ul-Haq as their policy to teach Iraq and Saddam Hussein a lesson for supporting the Baloch liberation fronts and movements.

United States and Soviet Union 

In 1974, India carried out a nuclear test, codenamed Smiling Buddha, near Pakistan's eastern border. Bhutto unsuccessfully lobbied for the United States to impose economic sanctions on India. However, at the request of Bhutto, Pakistan's Ambassador to the United States convened a meeting with Secretary of State Henry Kissinger. Kissinger told Pakistan's ambassador to Washington that the test is "a fait accompli and that Pakistan would have to learn to live with it," although he was aware this was a "little rough" on the Pakistanis. In 1976, the ties were further severed with Bhutto as Bhutto had continued to administer the research on weapons, and in 1976, in a meeting with Bhutto and Kissinger, Kissinger had told to Bhutto, "that if you [Bhutto] do not cancel, modify or postpone the Reprocessing Plant Agreement, we will make a horrible example from you". The meeting was ended by Bhutto as he had replied: For my country's sake, for the sake of people of Pakistan, I did not succumb to that black-mailing and threats.

After this meeting, Bhutto intensified Pakistan's foreign policy towards more onto Movement of Non-Aligned Countries, and sought to developed relations with both Soviet Union and the United States. Bhutto was keenly aware of Great Britain's policy of "divide and rule", and American policy of "unite and rule". In 1974, Bhutto, as Prime minister, visited Soviet Union. Prime Minister Bhutto deliberately undertook to improve relations with the Soviet Union and the Communist bloc. Bhutto sought to developed and alleviated the Soviet–Pakistani relations, with Soviet Union established Pakistan Steel Mills in 1972. The foundation stone for this gigantic project was laid on 30 December 1973 by Bhutto. Facing inexperience for the erection work of the integrated steel mill, Bhutto requested Soviet Union to send its experts. Soviet Union sends dozens of advisors and experts, under Russian scientist Mikhail Koltokof, who supervised the construction of this integrated Steel Mills, with a number of industrial and consortium companies financing this mega-project.

Although Richard Nixon enjoyed friendly relations with Bhutto, Pakistan's relationship with United States deteriorated under the Presidency of Jimmy Carter, as the US opposed Pakistan's nuclear programme. Carter tightened the embargo placed on Pakistan and placed pressure through the United States Ambassador to Pakistan, Brigadier-General Henry Byroade. Bhutto's socialist orientation upset the United States, which feared Pakistan's loss as an ally in the Cold war. When Carter was elected in 1976, he announced in his inaugural speech that he would seek the ban of nuclear weapons. With Carter's election, Bhutto lost the links to the United States administration that he had enjoyed through Nixon.

Although Carter placed an embargo on Pakistan, Bhutto continued to obtain materials to develop Pakistan's atomic bomb project., leading to the failure of Strategic Arms Limitation Talks.

Afghanistan and Central Asia 

In 1972, Bhutto initially tried to build friendly ties with Afghanistan but such attempts where rebuffed in 1973. In 1974, Afghanistan began covert involvement in Pakistan's Khyber Pakhtunkhwa which became increasingly disturbing for Bhutto's government. Afghan President Dawood Khan's controversial Pashtunisation policies resulted in Pakistan with gruesome violence and civil disturbances. The ISI quickly pointed out that President Daud was providing safe havens and training camps to anti-Pakistan militants and its intelligence agency had been a main arm of supporting the actions inside Pakistan, including providing support to Baloch separatists. Therefore, Bhutto's government decided to retaliate, and Bhutto launched a covert counter-operation in 1974 under the command of Major-General Naseerullah Babar, who was then Director-General of the M.I. Directorate-General for Western Fronts (DGWI). According to General Baber, it was an excellent idea and it had hard-hitting impact on Afghanistan. The aim of this operation was to arm the Islamic fundamentalists and to instigate an attack in different parts of Afghanistan. In 1974, Bhutto authorised a covert operation in Kabul and the Pakistan Air Force and the members of AI and the ISI successfully extradited Burhanuddin Rabbani, Jan Mohammad Khan, Gulbadin Hekmatyar, and Ahmad Shah Massoud to Peshawar, amid fear that Rabbani may be assassinated. By the end of 1974, Bhutto gave final authorisation of covert operation to train Afghan mujaheddin to take on Daoud Khan's government. This operation was an ultimate success.

By 1976 Daud had become concerned about his country's over dependence on the Soviet Union and the rising insurgency. On 7 June 1976, Bhutto paid a three-day state visit to Afghanistan, followed by a five-day visit of Daud Khan to Pakistan in August 1976. On 2 March 1977, an agreement on the resumption of air communications between Afghanistan and Pakistan was reached, as relations continued to improve. Bhutto and Daud made an exchange of official visits to force Afghanistan to accept the Durand Line as the permanent border. However, these developments were interrupted as Bhutto was removed and Daud Khan was also overthrown in a military coup shortly after. Western experts viewed Bhutto's policy as "astute policy" in regards to the border question, as it increased pressure on Afghanistan and very likely helped stimulate Afghan government's move towards accommodation. The Deputy Afghan Foreign Minister Abdul Samad Ghaus also admitted that before the compromise Afghanistan had been heavily involved inside Pakistan.

Decline

Popular unrest 

Bhutto began facing considerable criticism and increasing unpopularity as his term progressed. Initially targeting the opposition leader Abdul Wali Khan and his National Awami Party (NAP), a democratic socialist party, the socialist and communist mass who gathered under Bhutto's leadership began to disintegrate, thus dividing and allying with secular fronts. Despite the ideological similarity of the two parties, clashes between them became increasingly fierce. This started with the federal government's ousting of the NAP provincial government in Balochistan for alleged secessionist activities, and ended with the ban on the NAP. Subsequently, much of the NAP top leadership was arrested, after Bhutto's confidant Hyatt Scherpaoi was killed in a Peshawar bomb blast. Another notable figure, Chief Justice Hamoodur Rahman died due to a cardiac arrest while in the office. Between the 1974 and 1976, many of Bhutto's original members had left Bhutto due to political differences or natural death causes. In 1974, Bhutto's trusted Science Advisor Abdus Salam also left Pakistan when Parliament declared Ahmadis as non-Muslims. With Salam's departure, the research on nuclear weapons slowed down the progress as Dr. Mubashir Hassan, now Bhutto's appointed Science Advisor, would focus on politics more than the science research. Many civil bureaucrats and military officers loyal to Bhutto were replaced by new faces. Bhutto found himself with new advisers and collaborators.

Dissidence also increased within the PPP and the murder of dissident leader Ahmed Raza Kasuri's father led to public outrage and intra-party hostility as Bhutto was accused of masterminding the crime. Powerful PPP leaders such as Ghulam Mustafa Khar, former Governor of Punjab, openly condemned Bhutto and called for protests against his regime. The political crisis in the North-West Frontier Province and Balochistan intensified as civil liberties remained suspended and an estimated 100,000 troops deployed there were accused of human rights abuses and killing large numbers of civilians.

On 8 January 1977, the opposition organized into the Pakistan National Alliance (PNA), a nine-party coalition against the government of Bhutto and his allies. Bhutto called fresh elections, but the PNA did not obtain a clear majority. The PNA faced defeat but did not accept the results, accusing their opponents of rigging the election. The dissidents ultimately claimed that 40 seats in the national assembly were rigged, and boycotted the provincial elections. In the face of the resulting low voter turnout, the PNA declared the newly elected Bhutto government as illegitimate. Hard-line Islamist leaders such as Maulana Maududi called for the overthrow of Bhutto's regime. Mubashir Hassan, Science Advisor of Bhutto, feared a possible coup against Bhutto. Hassan entered the dispute and made an unsuccessful attempt to reach an agreement with PNA. Most Islamists refused to meet with Hassan as they saw him as the architect of Bhutto's success. The same year, an intensive crackdown was initiated on the Pakistan Muslim League, a conservative front. The People's National Party's President and former Leader of the Opposition Khan Vali Khan saw Bhutto's actions as his last stand against PNA, the Armed Forces and Bhutto, including his colleagues, were isolated. In an open public seminar, Vali Khan quoted that "There is one possible grave for two people ... let us see who gets in first". The Federal Security Force allegedly either arrested or extrajudicially killed members of the Muslim League. Following this, amid protest and civil distress felt in Lahore, and People's Party lost the administrative control over the city.

Military coup 
On 3 July 1977, then-Major-General K.M. Arif secretly met Bhutto, revealing that the planning of a coup had been taking place in the General Combatant Headquarters (GHQ). At this secret meeting, General Arif encouraged Bhutto to "rush the negotiation with the PNA, before it's too late". Intensifying political and civil disorder prompted Bhutto to hold talks with PNA leaders, which culminated in an agreement for the dissolution of the assemblies and fresh elections under a government of national unity. However, on 5 July 1977 Bhutto and members of his cabinet were arrested by troops under the order of General Zia. It is generally believed that the coup took place on the pretext of unrest despite Bhutto having reached an agreement with the opposition.

Bhutto had good intelligence within the Army, and officers such as Major-General Tajamül Hussain Malik were loyal to him until the end. However, General Zia-ul-Haq ordered a training programme with the officers from Special Air Service (SAS). General Zia-ul-Haq ordered many of Bhutto's loyal officers to attend the first course. However, classes for senior officers were delayed until the midnight. None of the officers were allowed to leave until late in the evening before the coup. During this time, arrangements for the coup were made.

General Zia announced that martial law had been imposed, the constitution suspended and all assemblies dissolved and promised elections within ninety days. Zia also ordered the arrest of senior PPP and PNA leaders but promised elections in October. Bhutto was released on 29 July and was received by a large crowd of supporters in his hometown of Larkana. He immediately began touring across Pakistan, delivering speeches to very large crowds and planning his political comeback. Bhutto was arrested again on 3 September before being released on bail on 13 September. Fearing yet another arrest, Bhutto named his wife, Nusrat, president of the Pakistan People's Party. Bhutto was imprisoned on 16 September and a large number of PPP leaders, notably Dr. Mubashir Hassan and activists were arrested and disqualified from contesting the elections. Observers noted that when Bhutto was removed from power in July 1977, thousands of Pakistanis cheered and were delighted.

Arrests and trial 

On 5 July 1977 the military, led by General Muhammad Zia-ul-Haq, staged a coup. Zia relieved prime minister Bhutto of power, holding him in detention for a month. Zia pledged that new elections would be held in 90 days. He kept postponing the elections and publicly retorted during successive press conferences that if the elections were held in the presence of Bhutto his party would not return to power again.

Upon his release, Bhutto travelled around the country amid adulatory crowds of PPP supporters. He used to take the train from the south to the north, and en route would address public meetings at different stations. Several of these trains were late, some by days, in reaching their respective destinations and as a result Bhutto was banned from traveling by train. The last visit he made to the city of Multan in the province of Punjab marked the turning point in Bhutto's political career and ultimately, his life. In spite of the administration's efforts to block the gathering, the crowd was so large that it became disorderly, providing an opportunity for the administration to declare that Bhutto, along with Dr. Hassan, had been taken into custody because the people were against him and it had become necessary to protect him from the masses for his own safety.

On 3 September, the Army arrested Bhutto again on charges of authorising the murder of a political opponent in March 1974. A 35-year-old politician Ahmed Raza Kasuri and his family had been ambushed, leaving Kasuri's father, Nawab Muhammad Ahmad Khan Kasuri, dead. Kasuri claimed that he was the actual target, accusing Bhutto of orchestrating the attack. Kasuri later claimed that he had been the target of 15 assassination attempts. Bhutto's wife Nusrat Bhutto assembled a team of top Pakistani lawyers for Bhutto's defence, led by Fakhruddin G. Ebrahim, Yahya Bakhtiar and Abdulhafiz Pirzada. Bhutto was released 10 days after his arrest after a judge, Justice KMA Samdani, found the evidence to be "contradictory and incomplete." As a result, Justice Samdani was immediately removed from the bench and placed at the disposal of the law ministry. Three days later Zia arrested Bhutto again on the same charges, this time under "martial law." When the PPP organised demonstrations among Bhutto's supporters, Zia cancelled the upcoming elections.

Bhutto was arraigned before the High Court of Lahore instead of in a lower court, thus depriving him of one level of appeal. The judge who had granted him bail had been removed. Five new judges were appointed, headed by Chief Justice of Lahore High Court Maulvi Mushtaq Hussain. Hussain had previously served as Bhutto's Foreign secretary in 1965, and was alleged to have strongly disliked and distrusted Bhutto. Hussain was not only a Zia appointee but also hailed from his home Jullundur district.

The trial lasted five months, and Bhutto appeared in court in a dock specially built for the trial. Proceedings began on 24 October 1977. Masood Mahmood, the director general of the Federal Security Force (since renamed the Federal Investigation Agency), testified against Bhutto. Mahmood had been arrested immediately after Zia's coup and had been imprisoned for two months prior to taking the stand. In his testimony, he claimed Bhutto had ordered Kasuri's assassination and that four members of the Federal Security Force had organised the ambush on Bhutto's orders. The four alleged assassins were arrested and later confessed. They were brought into court as "co-accused" but one of them recanted his testimony, declaring that it had been extracted from him under torture. The following day, the witness was not present in court and the prosecution claimed that he had suddenly "fallen ill".

Bhutto's defence team fought the case efficiently and challenged the prosecution with evidence from an army logbook the prosecution had submitted. It showed that the jeep allegedly driven during the attack on Kasuri was not even in Lahore at the time. The prosecution had the logbook disregarded as "incorrect". During the cross-examination by the defence of witnesses, the bench often interrupted questioning. The 706-page official transcript contained none of the objections or inconsistencies in the evidence pointed out by the defence. Former U.S. Attorney General Ramsey Clark called it a mock trial fought in a Kangaroo court. Having witnessed the trial, Clark later wrote:

When Bhutto began his testimony on 25 January 1978, Chief Justice Maulvi Mushtaq closed the courtroom to all observers. Bhutto responded by refusing to say any more. Bhutto demanded a retrial, accusing the Chief Justice of bias, after Mushtaq allegedly insulted Bhutto's home province. The court refused his demand.

Death sentence and appeal 

On 18 March 1978, Bhutto was declared guilty of murder, and was sentenced to death. Bhutto's former Legal Minister, Abdul Hafiz Pirzada petitioned the Supreme Court for the release of Bhutto's Science Adviser, Mubashir Hassan, and to review Bhutto's death sentence based on the split decision. The Supreme Court denied Hassan's release because he was held by Military Police, but the court agreed to hear the arguments. After 12 days of proceedings, the Supreme Court concluded that the President of Pakistan can change a death sentence into life imprisonment. Pirzada filed an application to then-Chief Martial Law Administrator. However, General Zia-ul-Haq did not act immediately and claimed that the application had gone missing.

Emotionally shattered, Pirzada informed Bhutto about the development and General Zia-ul-Haq's intention. Therefore, Bhutto did not seek an appeal. While he was transferred to a cell in Rawalpindi central jail, his family appealed on his behalf, and a hearing before the Supreme Court commenced in May. Bhutto was given one week to prepare. Bhutto issued a thorough rejoinder to the charges, although Zia blocked its publication. Chief Justice S. Anwarul Haq adjourned the court until the end of July 1978, supposedly because five of the nine appeal court judges were willing to overrule the Lahore verdict. One of the pro-Bhutto judges was due to retire in July.

Chief Justice S. Anwarul Haq presided over the trial, despite being close to Zia, even serving as Acting President when Zia was out of the country. Bhutto's lawyers managed to secure Bhutto the right to conduct his own defence before the Supreme Court. On 18 December 1978, Bhutto made his appearance in public before a packed courtroom in Rawalpindi. By this time he had been on death row for 9 months and had gone without fresh water for the previous 25 days. He addressed the court for four days, speaking without notes.

The appeal was completed on 23 December 1978. On 6 February 1979, the Supreme Court issued a guilty verdict, a decision reached by a bare 4-to-3 majority. The Bhutto family had seven days in which to appeal. The court granted a stay of execution while it studied the petition. By 24 February 1979 when the next court hearing began, appeals for clemency arrived from many heads of state. Zia said that the appeals amounted to "trade union activity" among politicians.

On 24 March 1979 the Supreme Court dismissed the appeal. Zia upheld the death sentence. Bhutto was hanged at Central Jail Rawalpindi, on 4 April 1979, after suffering severe torture in jail which resulted in vomiting and severe pain in chest, and was buried at his family mausoleum in Garhi Khuda Baksh.

During his imprisonment, Bhutto's children Murtaza and Benazir worked on rallying the international support for the release of their father. Libya's Colonel Gaddafi sent his Prime Minister Abdus Salam Jalloud on an emergency trip to Pakistan to hold talks with Pakistan's military establishment for the release of Bhutto. In a press conference, Jalloud told the journalists that Gaddafi had offered General Zia to exile him to Libya, and Prime Minister Jalloud stayed in the Islamabad International Airport where the specially designated Presidential aircraft waited for Bhutto. However, after a week of staying at the airport, General Zia rejected Prime Minister Jalloud's request and upheld the death sentence. Much of the Muslim world was shocked at Bhutto's execution. Before being hanged, Bhutto made a final speech and his last words were: "Oh Lord, help me for... I am innocent."

Re-opening of the Bhutto trial 
On 2 April 2011, 32 years after Bhutto's trial and execution, the PPP (the ruling party at that time) filed a petition at the Supreme Court to reopen Bhutto's trial. At the Geo News, senior journalist Iftikhar Ahmad aired a series of televised interviews with those who played a major and often controversial role in Bhutto's death. A legal team was organized by the Prime Minister Yousaf Raza Gillani's cabinet seeking to reopen the trial. President Asif Ali Zardari gave his consent to the resulting presidential order named Article 186 of the Constitution, the Supreme Court taking up the petition on 13 April 2011. Chief Justice Iftikhar Chaudhry eventually presided the three-judge-bench (although it was expanded with law experts from four provinces of Pakistan), while Minister of Law Babar Awan counseled Bhutto's case.

With immediate effect, Babar Awan resigned as Law Minister, even leaving the Justice Ministry entirely in order to legally counsel Bhutto's case completely independently. In his noting remarks, Chief Justice Chaudhry praised and appreciated the move by the senior PPP leadership and remarked the gesture as "historic". In a crucial advancement, the Supreme Court ordered the decision on the legal status of Bhutto's execution to a to-be-formed larger bench.

After a series of hearings at the Supreme Court, the case was adjourned and dismissed after the PPP approved the suspension of Babar Awan on 2 May 2012.

Personal life 
Bhutto's first marriage took place in 1943, to his cousin Shireen Amir Begum, however they separated. On 8 September 1951 Zulfiquar Ali Bhutto married Nusrat Ispahani of Iranian Kurdish origin, popularly known as Begum Nusrat Bhutto in Karachi. Their first child, Benazir, was born in 1953. She was followed by Murtaza in 1954, Sanam in 1957 and Shahnawaz in 1958.

Legacy 

Bhutto remains a controversial and widely discussed figure in Pakistan. While he was hailed for his nationalism, Bhutto was roundly criticized for intimidating his political opponents. By the time Bhutto was given the control of his country in 1971, Pakistan was in a state of disrepair and demoralization after a bloody civil war. His political rivals had blamed his socialist policies for slowing down Pakistan's economic progress, as they caused poor productivity and high costs; however, Bhutto countered that he was merely addressing the massive inequality built up over the Ayub Khan (General) years.

Bhutto is blamed by some quarters for causing the Bangladesh Liberation War. In 1977, General Zia-ul-Haq released former general Yahya Khan from prison and his Lieutenant-General Fazle Haq gave him the honorary guard of honor when the former general died in 1980. After being released from house arrest after the 1977 coup Yahya said, "It was Bhutto, not Mujib, who broke Pakistan. Bhutto's stance in 1971 and his stubbornness harmed Pakistan's solidarity much more than Sheikh Mujib's six-point demand. It was his high ambitions and rigid stance that led to rebellion in East Pakistan. He riled up the Bengalis and brought an end to Pakistan's solidarity. East Pakistan broke away." Other army men who lay blame for 1971 on Bhutto include future President Pervez Musharraf and East Pakistan's former Martial Law Administrator Syed Mohammad Ahsan. Bhutto is also often criticised for human-rights abuses in Baluchistan by hardline Islamists as well as conservatives. Bhutto's actions during the 1970s operation in Balochistan are also criticised for failing to bring about a lasting peace in the region.

Bhutto's international image is more positive, casting him as a secular internationalist. Domestically, despite the criticism, Bhutto still remains Pakistan's most popular leader. During his premiership, Bhutto succeeded in uniting all the parties in getting the 1973 constitution enacted. His determined and aggressive embrace of nuclear weapons for Pakistan has made him regarded as the father of Pakistan's nuclear-deterrence programme, which he pursued in spite of Pakistan's limited financial resources and strong opposition from the United States. In 2006, The Atlantic described Bhutto as demagogic and extremely populist, but still Pakistan's greatest civilian leader. Even though Henry Kissinger developed differences with Bhutto, in his 1979 memoir White House Years he conceded that Bhutto was "brilliant, charming, of global stature in his perception, a man of extraordinary abilities, capable of drawing close to any country that served Pakistan's national interests".

While, Bhutto's former Law Minister Mairaj Muhammad Khan described Bhutto as "a great man but cruel". His family remained active and influential in politics, with first his wife and then his daughter becoming leader of the PPP political party. His eldest daughter, Benazir Bhutto, was twice Prime Minister of Pakistan, and was assassinated on 27 December 2007, while campaigning for 2008 elections. While his son, Murtaza Bhutto, served as the Member Parliament of Pakistan, and was also assassinated in a controversial police encounter.

Roedad Khan, former statesman who served under Bhutto, further wrote in his book, Pakistan—A dream gone sour, that after 1971, Bhutto started extremely well, bringing the isolated, angered, apprehended, and dismembered nation back into her feet and gave the respectable place in the world, in a shortest period... With a gift of giving the nation a parliamentary system and furthermore the ambitious successful development of atomic bomb programme in a record time, are his greatest achievements in his life, for Pakistan and her people, but sadly deteriorated at the end". Bhutto remains highly influential in country's public, scientific, and political circles; his name yet continues to resonate in Pakistan's collective memory.

With all the criticism and opposition, Bhutto remained highly influential and respected figure even after his death. Bhutto is widely regarded as being among the most influential men in the history of Pakistan. His supporters gave him the title Quaid-e-Awam (Leader of the people).

Eponyms 
 Shaheed Zulfiqar Ali Bhutto Institute of Science and Technology, a science and engineering institute named after Zulfikar Ali Bhutto, located in Karachi, Sindh of Pakistan.
 ZA Bhutto Agricultural College, an agriculture engineering and science college named after Zulfikar Ali Bhutto, located at Larkana, Sindh, Pakistan.
 Zulfiqarabad, a planned city in Larkana District of Sindh, Pakistan. The city is named in memory of Zulfiqar Ali Bhutto.

Books 

 Peace-Keeping by the United Nations, Pakistan Publishing House, Karachi, 1967
 Political Situation in Pakistan, Veshasher Prakashan, New Delhi, 1968
 The Myth of Independence, Oxford University Press, Karachi and Lahore, 1969
 The Great Tragedy, Pakistan People's Party, Karachi, 1971
 Marching Towards Democracy, (collections of speeches), 1972
 Politics of the People (speeches, statements and articles), 1948–1971
 The Third World: New Directions, Quartet Books, London, 1977
 My Pakistan, Biswin Sadi Publications, New Delhi, 1979
 If I am Assassinated, Vikas, New Delhi, 1979 on-line 
 My Execution, Musawaat Weekly International, London, 1980
 New Directions, Narmara Publishers, London, 1980

See also 

 Ghinwa Bhutto
 Jumo Faqir
 Nusrat Bhutto
 List of presidents of Pakistan
 List of prime ministers of Pakistan
 Movement for the Restoration of Democracy

References

Bibliography

External links 

 Official web site of Zulfikar Ali Bhutto
 Biography with brief video clip from TV address on 18 November 1970
 Zulfikar Ali Bhutto at Encyclopedia Sindhiana
 
 

|-

|-

|-

|-

|-

|-

|-

|-

|-

 
1928 births
1979 deaths
1974 crimes
20th-century executions by Pakistan
Alumni of Christ Church, Oxford
Alumni of the Inns of Court School of Law
St. Xavier's College, Mumbai alumni
Zulfikar Ali
Cathedral and John Connon School alumni
Causes and prelude of the Bangladesh Liberation War
Defence Ministers of Pakistan
Executed Pakistani people
Executed people from Larkana
Executed presidents
Executed prime ministers
Foreign Ministers of Pakistan
Interior ministers of Pakistan
Members of Lincoln's Inn
Nuclear history of Pakistan
Pakistan Army civilians
Pakistan People's Party politicians
Pakistani democracy activists
Pakistani prisoners and detainees
Pakistani people convicted of murder
Pakistani socialists
People convicted of murder by Pakistan
People executed by Pakistan by hanging
People executed for murder
People from Larkana District
Presidents of Pakistan
Prime Ministers of Pakistan
Members of the Pakistan Philosophical Congress
Project-706
Sindhi people
Speakers of the National Assembly of Pakistan
Trials in Pakistan
University of California, Berkeley alumni
University of Southern California alumni
Leaders ousted by a coup
Pakistani political party founders
Recipients of Hilal-i-Pakistan
Muslim socialists
Heads of government who were later imprisoned
People of the insurgency in Balochistan
People from Lahore